...Nothing Like the Sun is the second solo studio album by English singer-songwriter Sting. The album was originally released on 5 October 1987 on A&M (worldwide). The album explores the genres of pop rock, soft rock, jazz, reggae, world, acoustic rock, dance-rock, and funk rock. The songs were recorded during March–August in 1987 in sessions that took place at Air Studios, in Montserrat, assisted by record producers Hugh Padgham, Bryan Loren, and Neil Dorfsman. It features a number of high-profile guest guitarists, including former Police member Andy Summers, Eric Clapton, Mark Knopfler, and Hiram Bullock, and is generally regarded as the culmination of the smoother, more adult-oriented sound of Sting's early work.

On release, the album was received favorably by the majority of music critics and in 1989, the album was ranked #90 on Rolling Stone magazine's list of the "100 Best Albums of the Eighties". "We'll Be Together", "Be Still My Beating Heart", "Englishman in New York", "Fragile", and "They Dance Alone" were all released as singles.

It won Best British Album at the 1988 Brit Awards. In 1989 the album received three Grammy nominations including Album of the Year while the album's second single ("Be Still My Beating Heart") was nominated for Song of the Year and Best Male Pop Vocal Performance.

Album title
The title comes from Shakespeare's Sonnet No. 130 ("My mistress' eyes are nothing like the sun"), which Sting used in the song "Sister Moon". He added that his inspiration for this was a close encounter with a drunk, in which Sting quoted the sonnet in response to the drunk's importunate query, "How beautiful is the moon?"

Production and recording
The album was influenced by two events in Sting's life: first, the death in late 1986 of his mother, which contributed to the sombre tone of several songs; and second, his participation in the Conspiracy of Hope Tour on behalf of Amnesty International, which brought Sting to parts of Latin America that had been ravaged by civil wars, and introduced him to victims of government oppression. "They Dance Alone (Cueca Solo)" was inspired by his witnessing of public demonstrations of grief by the wives and daughters of men missing in Chile, tortured and murdered by the military dictatorship of the time, who danced the Cueca (the traditional dance of Chile) by themselves, with photos of their loved ones pinned to their clothes. "Be Still My Beating Heart" and "The Lazarus Heart" approach the subjects of life, love and death. Elsewhere on the album, "Englishman in New York", in honour of Quentin Crisp, continues the jazz-influenced music more commonly found on Sting's previous album, as does "Sister Moon". "The Lazarus Heart" was originally written by Sting as the musical finale of the 1988 film, Who Framed Roger Rabbit in an early draft in which the novel, Who Censored Roger Rabbit?'''s tragic ending where Roger is killed in the crossfire in the final duel was still in the script. When Disney ordered its default ending (where Roger is still alive in the final duel) to be used, the song got deleted and ended up on Sting's album instead.

Release
The album's first single and biggest hit, "We'll Be Together" sported a prominent dance beat and funk overtones; it reached No. 7 on the Billboard Hot 100 charts in late 1987 and even crossed over to the R&B charts. The album was one of the most expensive ever recorded at the time, resulting in a list price that was higher than most to cover the costs of exhausting recording costs.

The album also inspired a Spanish/Portuguese counterpart, the 1988 mini-album Nada Como el Sol. It featured four of the songs from the album sung in either Spanish or Portuguese, and in the case of "Fragile", both languages. The Brazilian CD edition of ...Nothing Like the Sun also contained "Fragile" in Portuguese ("Frágil") as the tenth track (between "Rock Steady" and "Sister Moon").

Three years after its release on both the album and in single form, "Englishman in New York" was remixed in mid-1990 by Dutch producer Ben Liebrand. Providing a stronger dance beat, as well as an extended introduction, the song was a hit in clubs and reached number 15 in the UK singles chart. The maxi-single also included a dance remix of "If You Love Somebody (Set Them Free)" as a B-side....Nothing Like the Sun was one of the first fully digital audio recordings (DDD) to achieve multi-platinum status.

In celebration of its 35th anniversary, an expanded edition of the album was released on October 13th, 2022. This digital-only release features the original 12 songs on the album, plus 14 bonus tracks that consist of B-sides, remixes, alternate versions, and instrumentals. 

Critical reception...Nothing Like the Sun was praised by many critics. In a review for Rolling Stone, Anthony DeCurtis wrote: "...Nothing Like the Sun represents impressive growth for Sting. His voice is rich, grainy and more mature; his ideas are gaining in complexity; and musically he is stretching without straining. His mistress's eyes may be nothing like the sun, but on this fine new album Sting's intrepid talent shines on brightly." In 1989, the album was ranked number 90 on Rolling Stones list of the "100 Best Albums of the Eighties".

In a retrospective review, AllMusic editor Stephen Thomas Erlewine described ...Nothing Like the Sun as "one of the most doggedly serious pop albums ever recorded" and noted the presence of only one uptempo song ("We'll Be Together"), with the remaining tracks being "too measured, calm, and deliberately subtle to be immediate". He found that it succeeds as "a mood piece – playing equally well as background music or as intensive, serious listening", and that while slightly overlong, "it's one of his better albums."

There were harsher assessments elsewhere. Robert Christgau of The Village Voice observed a "more relaxed" Sting on the album but deemed it "pretentious" on the whole, while Greg Kot of the Chicago Tribune felt that Sting's "nuanced singing and literate lyrics" are "weighed down by ponderous music." Trouser Press'' critic Ira Robbins disparaged the album as "self-important" and "a tedious, bankrupt and vacuous cavern of a record."

Commercial performance
In the United States, the album debuted at number 54 on the US Billboard 200 chart on the week of 31 October 1987 and eventually peaked at number nine in its third week of release. The album spent a total of 52 weeks on the chart. On 24 October 1991, the album was certified double platinum by the Recording Industry Association of America (RIAA) for sales of over two million copies in the United States.

In the UK, the album debuted and peaked at number one on the UK Albums Chart. In the second week the album dropped to number three. It spent a total of 42 weeks on the chart. The album was certified platinum by the British Phonographic Industry (BPI) for sales of over 300,000 copies in the United Kingdom.

Track listing

B-sides
"Ghost in the Strand" ("Englishman in New York" 7"/ Maxi Single)
"Ellas Danzan Solas" (Spanish version of "They Dance Alone", "They Dance Alone" Maxi Single)
"If You There" ("They Dance Alone" 7")
"Conversation with a Dog" ("We'll Be Together" 7"/ Maxi Single)
"Someone to Watch over Me" (George Gershwin's cover, "Englishman in New York" 3-inch CD single)
"Up from the Skies" (Jimi Hendrix cover with Gil Evans and His Orchestra, "Englishman in New York" 3-inch CD single)

Singles

 1987 – "We'll Be Together" #7 US
 1988 – "Be Still My Beating Heart" #15 US
 1988 – "Englishman in New York" #84 US #51 UK
 1988 – "Fragile" #70 UK
 1988 – "They Dance Alone" #94 UK
 1990 – "Englishman in New York" (Remix) #15 UK

Personnel 
 Sting – vocals, arrangements, bass guitar (1-9, 12), Spanish guitar (4), acoustic guitar (6) double bass (10)
 Kenny Kirkland – keyboards 
 Gil Evans – keyboards (11)
 Gil Evans and His Orchestra – orchestra (11)
 Ken Helman – acoustic piano (12)
 Andy Summers – guitars (1, 2)
 Eric Clapton – guitar (5)
 Fareed Haque – guitar (5)
 Mark Knopfler – guitar (5)
 Hiram Bullock – guitars (11)
 Mark Egan – bass guitar (11)
 Manu Katché – drums (1-10, 12)
 Kenwood Dennard – drums (11)
 Andy Newmark – additional drums
 Mino Cinelu – percussion, vocoder
 Branford Marsalis – saxophones
 Renée Geyer – backing vocals
 Dolette McDonald – backing vocals
 Janice Pendarvis – backing vocals 
 Pamela Quinlan – backing vocals 
 Rubén Blades – Spanish vocals (5)
 Annie Lennox – backing vocals (7)
 Vesta Williams – backing vocals (7)

Production 
 Producers – Sting (all tracks); Neil Dorfsman (Tracks 1-6 & 8-12); Bryan Loren (Track 7).
 Production Assistants on Tracks 1-6 & 8-12 – Ken Blair and Dave O'Donnell
 Recording and Mixing – Neil Dorfsman and Hugh Padgham (Tracks 1-6 & 8-12); Paul McKenna (Track 7).
 Mix Assistants – Mark McKenna and Bob Vogt (Tracks 1-6 & 8-12); John Hegedes (Track 7).
 Mastered by Bob Ludwig at Masterdisk (New York, NY).
 Art Direction and Design – Richard Frankel
 Photography – Brian Aris

Charts

Weekly charts

Year-end charts

Decade-end charts

Certifications and sales

}

References

1987 albums
Sting (musician) albums
A&M Records albums
Brit Award for British Album of the Year
Albums produced by Hugh Padgham
Soft rock albums by English artists
Albums recorded at AIR Studios